Endocarpon is a genus of saxicolous (rock-dwelling), crustose lichens in the family Verrucariaceae. The genus was circumscribed by German bryologist Johann Hedwig in 1789.

Species
 Endocarpon adscendens 
 Endocarpon aridum  – Australia
 Endocarpon baicalense 
 Endocarpon crassisporum  – Australia
 Endocarpon crystallinum  – China
 Endocarpon deserticola  – China
 Endocarpon helmsianum 
 Endocarpon macrosporum  – Australia
 Endocarpon maritima  – South Korea
 Endocarpon muelleri 
 Endocarpon myeloxanthum  – Mexico
 Endocarpon pallidulum 
 Endocarpon pallidum 
 Endocarpon petrolepideum 
 Endocarpon pseudosubnitescens 
 Endocarpon pusillum 
 Endocarpon riparium  – Brazil
 Endocarpon robustum  – Australia
 Endocarpon rogersii  – Australia
 Endocarpon simplicatum 
 Endocarpon subramulosum  – South Korea
 Endocarpon tenuissimum 
 Endocarpon unifoliatum  – China
 Endocarpon zschackei

References

Gallery

Verrucariales
Eurotiomycetes genera
Lichen genera
Taxa named by Johann Hedwig
Taxa described in 1789